Closys College is an educational institution located in the city of Mekelle, situated in the northern Tigray Regional State of Ethiopia. It is 783 kilometers away from Addis Ababa, the capital, to the north.

Universities and colleges in Ethiopia